Siegbert Droese (born 7 June 1969) is a German politician for the populist Alternative for Germany (AfD) and since 2017 member of the Bundestag, the federal legislative body. He is a member of the völkisch-nationalistic Flügel of his party.

Life 

Droese was born 1969 in the East German city of Leipzig and became a hotelier.

Politics
Within AfD Droese is referred as "ultra-nationalist". Droese is believed to be a fan of Adolf Hitler. In 2016, it became known that one of his cars bore the Leipzig license plate "AH 1818". In the nazi symbolism, "AH" stands for Adolf Hitler as well as "18".

With a swollen chest and right hand on his heart, Droese had himself photographed at "Hitlers Wolfsschanze" ("Wolf`s Lair"), the former Führer's headquarters in Poland.

Droese entered the than newly founded AfD and got at 2017 German federal election elected to Bundestag.

References

Living people
1969 births
Members of the Bundestag for Saxony
Politicians from Leipzig
Members of the Bundestag 2017–2021
Members of the Bundestag for the Alternative for Germany